Michael "Mike" Simcoe (born  1959–1960) is an automobile designer from Melbourne, Australia. He currently serves as General Motors' Vice President of Global Design, a position he has held since 2016.

Simcoe received an Associate Diploma of Art Industrial Design from the Royal Melbourne Institute of Technology. He joined GM Holden as a designer in 1983, and was subsequently promoted to senior designer and chief designer in 1985 and 1987 respectively. In 1995, he became director of Design for GM Asia Pacific, overlooking collaborative projects with Daewoo, Suzuki, Fuji Heavy Industries and Isuzu. He was appointed director of Design at GM Holden in 2001, and later executive director of Asia Pacific Design in 2003, establishing GM Korea Design Operations. He was also Executive Director North American Exterior Design and Global Architecture Strategy starting from 2004, supervising various designs such as the Buick LaCrosse, Cadillac CTS and Chevrolet Camaro. The most recent position he held before becoming Vice President of Global Design was being the executive director of General Motors International Operations Design from in 2011.

Following Ed Welburn's announcement on April 8, 2016, that he would retire after 44 years at General Motors, Simcoe received the position of Vice President of Global Design, effective July 1, 2016.

Notable designs 
 Holden Coupe concept (1998)
 Holden Commodore (VX) (2000)
 Holden Caprice/Statesman (WH) (2000)
 Holden Monaro (2001)
 Holden Commodore (VE) (2006)
 Holden Caprice (WM) (2006)
 Buick Avenir (2015)
 Chevrolet Bolt concept (2015)

References 

Living people

Australian businesspeople
General Motors designers
Australian automobile designers
1959 births